Neal A. Halsey (born 1945) is an American pediatrician, with sub-specialty training in infectious diseases, international health and epidemiology.  Halsey is a professor emeritus of international health and director emeritus of the Institute for Vaccine Safety at the Johns Hopkins Bloomberg School of Public Health, in Baltimore, Maryland. He had a joint appointment in the Department of Pediatrics at the Johns Hopkins School of Medicine and serves as co-director of the Center for Disease Studies and Control in Guatemala.

In 1999 he spearheaded the precautionary movement to remove thimerosal from pediatric vaccines.

Education 
Halsey received his MD in 1971 from the University of Wisconsin–Madison.  He completed his internship in pediatrics at The Children's Hospital in Denver, Colorado in 1972; his residency in pediatrics at the University of Colorado Medical Center in 1975.  Halsey was an EIS officer 1975–77; a preventive medicine resident 1976–78 and a fellow in Pediatric Infectious Diseases at the University of Colorado 1978–80.

Research and professional experience 
Halsey started his teaching career at Tulane University, New Orleans, Louisiana, in the Departments of Pediatrics (School of Medicine) and Tropical Medicine (School of Public Health and Tropical Medicine).  Halsey was also Medical Epidemiologist and Chief of Surveillance Activities at CDC and General Medical Officer and Medical Officer in Charge at the Indian Health Service at Fort Yates, North Dakota.
 
Halsey has published more than 200 scientific articles in peer reviewed journals regarding vaccines and vaccine safety and authored or co-authored nearly 40 book chapters.  He has contributed information to the Institute of Medicine(IOM) and the Public Health Service (PHS) for reviews of individual vaccine safety issues, provided expert testimony and reviews of vaccine injury legal claims involving the National Vaccine Injury Compensation Program (VICP), vaccine makers, and the Food and Drug Administration (FDA).  He served with the Centers for Disease Control (CDC) in the Immunization Division, and served on the Research and Development Group of the World Health Organization (WHO) Expanded Program on Immunization.  He has been a member or advisory member of the CDC Advisory Committee on Immunization Practices (ACIP), and was a member of the Committee on Infectious Diseases of the American Academy of Pediatrics (AAP) 1989–99; COID Chair 1995–99.

Halsey's research is primarily directed toward the prevention of infectious diseases with the safest vaccines possible.  He has conducted or participated in epidemiological studies of vaccine-preventable diseases and phase I, II, and III vaccine trials of hepatitis A, hepatitis B, inactivated polio virus, pertussis, Haemophilus influenzae type B, tetanus, Lyme disease, rotavirus, Argentina Hemorrhagic Fever, human papillomavirus (HPV) and influenzae vaccine viruses. Measles control has been an interest of Halsey's, and he supports ongoing measles and polio eradication efforts.

Halsey has worked internationally in many developing countries including Haiti, Peru, Guatemala, Kenya, Thiopia and Pakistan. A lot of his works in Haiti focused on maternal and child health issues. He collaborated with Reginald Boulos on many of these papers.

Institute for Vaccine Safety 
Halsey is the director emeritus of the Institute for Vaccine Safety, which was established in 1997 at the Johns Hopkins Bloomberg School of Public Health to provide information to parents, physicians and journalists about vaccines and vaccine safety issues.

Select publications 
 MZ Dudley, DA Salmon, NA Halsey, WA Orenstein, Limaye RJ, O'Leary ST, et al.  The Clinician's Vaccine Safety Resource Guide: Optimizing Prevention of Vaccine-Preventable Diseases Across the Lifespan, Switzerland: Springer; 2018.

 
 
 
 
 
 
 
 
 
  Erratum in: Canadian Medical Association Journal 2008 Sep 23;179(7):678.

References

External links 
 VaccineSafety.edu - Institute for Vaccine Safety (Dr. Halsey's homepage)
 VaccineSafety.edu -  'Prepared Testimony of Neal A. Halsey M.D. Before the House Committee on Government Reform Safety and Efficacy Issues' (October 12, 1999)
 The Not-So-Crackpot Autism Theory, Arthur Allen, ''New York Times (November 10, 2002)

1950 births
Living people
American pediatricians
American epidemiologists
University of Wisconsin School of Medicine and Public Health alumni